The 2019–20 season is Quilmes' 3rd consecutive season in the second division of Argentine football, Primera B Nacional.

The season generally covers the period from 1 July 2019 to 30 June 2020.

Review

Pre-season
Quilmes' first exit of 2019–20 was agreed back in May 2019, as Augusto Max switched Argentina for Greece by joining Volos. On 14 June, Leandro González arrived from Temperley to become Quilmes' first reinforcement. Alejandro Altuna (San Martín (T) followed in on 18 June. Quilmes played their first pre-season friendlies on 21 June versus Futbolistas Argentinos Agremiados, initially beating the team of free agents 3–0 before drawing 1–1. 26 June saw Franco Niell depart to Barracas Central, two days prior to Quilmes' second set of exhibitions against Puerto Nuevo of Primera D Metropolitana; they won by an aggregate of 6–0. 2018–19 loans ended on 30 June. July opened with them meeting Uruguay's Fénix; sharing wins. Martín Prost signed from Sport Boys on 4 July.

An incoming and an outgoing were made official on 5 July, as Gabriel Ramírez joined from Lanús while Juan Larrea headed to Greece with second tier club Apollon Smyrnis. Argentino were dispatched across two friendlies on 6 July, with José Luis Valdez netting a hat-trick in a 5–1 victory; the day's latter fixture. Three days later, Abel Masuero penned terms from Atlético de Rafaela. Quilmes failed to beat upcoming divisional rivals Agropecuario in matches on 12 July, as a goalless draw was followed by a loss. Also on that date, former Belgrano player Federico Álvarez came to the club. San Martín (T) publicised the arrival of Mauro Bellone on 13 July. Preparations continued on 17 July as they avoided defeat in two games with Brown at the Estadio Centenario Ciudad de Quilmes.

Goalkeeper Alejandro Medina was announced as Quilmes' seventh signing on 17 July. Alan Ferreyra was loaned to Colegiales forty-eight hours later. Two sets of friendlies occurred between 20/24 July versus Aldosivi and Talleres, with the games ending in similar fashion after goalless draws were followed by two-goal Quilmes wins. On the same day as the latter, Emanuel Bilbao joined from Alvarado. An encounter with Almagro, scheduled for 27 July, was postponed, though the two did eventually meet on 30 July - with both match-ups concluding scoreless. Quilmes' next non-competitive opponents were San Telmo, who they defeated on 3 August; Tomás Blanco secured a one-nil, prior to Justo Giani, Camilo Machado, Tomás Verón Lupi and José Luis Valdez scoring in a 4–0 result.

Quilmes netted four times again in their penultimate friendlies over Villa San Carlos on 7 August, as a 4–2 came after a 0–0. Their final opposition in pre-season was set to be Chacarita Juniors, though an encounter with them was cancelled late on. On the eve of their Primera B Nacional bow for 2019–20, Quilmes revealed a double incoming of Carlos Matheu (Unión Española) and Bautista Cejas (Estudiantes (LP).

August
A trip to recent Primera División team and Copa de la Superliga holders Tigre opened Quilmes' campaign in Primera B Nacional on 18 August, with El Cervecero taking the points after goals from David Drocco and Federico Álvarez. Christian Sterli became Quilmes' new president on 25 August, replacing Marcelo Calello. Quilmes won their second match in the league on 26 August, defeating Defensores de Belgrano 1–0 at the Estadio Centenario Ciudad de Quilmes.

September
Quilmes dropped their first points of 2019–20 on 2 September against Gimnasia y Esgrima (M), though maintained their unbeaten streak after drawing 0–0 in Mendoza.

Squad

Transfers
Domestic transfer windows:3 July 2019 to 24 September 201920 January 2020 to 19 February 2020.

Transfers in

Transfers out

Loans out

Friendlies

Pre-season
Quilmes scheduled friendlies with twelve opponents, kicking off with an encounter against Futbolistas Argentinos Agremiados, a team of free agents, in June before concluding with an exhibition match with Chacarita Juniors in August.

Competitions

Primera B Nacional

Results summary

Matches
The fixtures for the 2019–20 league season were announced on 1 August 2019, with a new format of split zones being introduced. Quilmes were drawn in Zone B.

Squad statistics

Appearances and goals

Statistics accurate as of 4 September 2019.

Goalscorers

Notes

References

Quilmes Atlético Club seasons
Quilmes